Dichomeris sutschanellus is a moth in the family Gelechiidae. It was described by Aristide Caradja in 1926. It is found in Amur in the Russian Far East.

References

Moths described in 1926
sutschanellus